Pavel Uvarov (born 22 March 1967) is a Russian badminton player. He competed in the men's singles tournament at the 1996 Summer Olympics.

References

1967 births
Living people
Russian male badminton players
Olympic badminton players of Russia
Badminton players at the 1996 Summer Olympics
Place of birth missing (living people)